Burgoyne was the class lead for a set of four locomotives built by the Dublin and Kingstown Railway (D&KR) in their own Grand Canal Street works from 1845.

History
Following the death of Richard Pim in August 1843 James Rawlins, a foreman at Grand Canal Street took position of locomotive superintendent.  Construction of the five locomotives of the Princess class had finished in 1843 however trains were becoming heavier and beyond the capability of the earlier locomotives.  The D&KR were essentially happy with basic  tank locomotives, but sent Rawlins to England to become acquainted with the latest developments in locomotive development before embarking on the stronger design.

The class lead was Burgoyne built in 1845 and named after Sir John Fox Burgoyne, the Commissioner of Public Works who was crucial to the D&KR obtaining public loans for the building of the railway and who had given advice on the strengthening of sea embankments in 1836. Subsequent locomotives were named Cyclops, Vulcan and Jupiter and were completed in by 1847–8.  Jupiter was the last new build locomotive for the D&KR.

As built in common will all D&KR tank engines the locomotives did not have brakes, the drivers stopping the locomotives when running light by skilled use of the reversing gear.  A bad collision with Cyclops coming with a train into Westland Row Station caused this policy to be altered and brakes were subsequently fitted to the locomotives.

1864 saw the bulk of Westland Row to Kingstown and Bray services handed over to the seven new locomotives Ariel Class from Neilsons which dwarfed the Burgonyes..  This led to the withdrawal of Burgoyne and Jupiter by 1872; while Cyclops and Vulcan were rebuilt in 1866 with longer boilers.

The Cyclops and Vulcan remained in service until the 1887 and long enough to acquire the DW&WR numbers 27 and 28.

Fleet

Notes

References

 
 
 
 

2-2-2WT locomotives
Railway locomotives introduced in 1845
Scrapped locomotives
Steam locomotives of Ireland
Standard gauge locomotives of Ireland
5 ft 3 in gauge locomotives